The Republican People's Party ( Hezb Al-Shaeb Al-Gomhuri) is an Egyptian political party made up of former government ministers.

The party supported Amr Moussa in the 2012 Egyptian presidential election. Hazem Omar denied that the party was composed of remnants (feloul) of the National Democratic Party, which was in power during the Mubarak era.

Electoral history

References 

2012 establishments in Egypt
Political parties established in 2012